Mordechai Ben Masoud Louk (also known as Josef Dahan) was an Israeli adventurer who was convicted by Israeli courts to 10 years in prison for spying for Egypt. He came to the focus of international attention when he was discovered by Italian authorities at the Rome airport, bound, gagged, drugged and packed in a trunk being sent to Cairo as diplomatic mail. In Rome Louk admitted to having "spied" for Egypt and was extradited to Israel on Israel's request.

Louk arrived in Israel from Spanish Morocco in 1949 and settled in Tel Aviv. In 1961 Louk defected from the Israeli army and escaped into the Gaza Strip, leaving behind a wife and four children.

References 

Israeli spies
20th-century Israeli criminals